The 2002 House elections in Washington occurred on November 5, 2002 to elect the members of the State of Washington's delegation to the United States House of Representatives. Washington has nine seats in the House, apportioned according to the 2000 United States Census. Though competitive races occurred in several districts, no seat switched hands as a result of the elections this year.

Overview

District 1

Incumbent Democratic Congressman Jay Inslee ran for a fourth nonconsecutive term in Congress from this fairly liberal district rooted in portions of the Kitsap Peninsula and Seattle’s northern suburbs. Inslee faced Republican candidate Joe Marine, a former Mukilteo City Councilman and State Representative. Though Marine gave Inslee one of the closest races of his career, the Congressman was successful on election day and bested Marine by a fourteen point margin.

District 2

Freshman Democratic Congressman Rick Larsen, who represents this northwestern Washington-based district, ran for re-election. Larsen faced Republican Norma Smith, an aide to former Congressman Jack Metcalf and a former South Whidbey school board member in the general election. Though Larsen attained a majority of the vote and retained his seat, Smith was able to keep her Democratic opponent to only a five point margin, surprisingly close in this marginally liberal district.

District 3

Though the southwestern Washington-based district that two-term Democratic incumbent Congressman Brian Baird represents is essentially a centrist district, the Congressman was able to perform surprisingly well against Republican State Senator Joseph Zarelli. Baird was overwhelmingly re-elected over Zarelli, receiving over sixty percent of the vote on election day.

District 4

In this solidly conservative, central Washington congressional district, incumbent Republican Congressman Doc Hastings faced Democrat Craig Mason, a sociology professor at Columbia Basin College in the general election. Owing to Congressman Hastings’s popularity and his district’s strong proclivity towards electing Republican candidates, the Congressman was re-elected in a landslide.

District 5

Running for his fifth term in Congress, incumbent Republican Congressman George Nethercutt faced Democratic candidate Bart Haggin and Libertarian candidate Rob Chase as obstacles to another term. In this staunchly conservative district rooted in the socially conservative counties of eastern Washington, Congressman Nethercutt hardly faced a challenge and easily won another term.

District 6

Long-serving Democratic Congressman Norm Dicks, the longest-serving of Washington congressmen, has represented this liberal-leaning, Kitsap Peninsula-based district since he was first elected in United States House of Representatives elections, 1980#Washington. Congressman Dicks faced Republican nominee Bob Lawrence in the general election, who was also his opponent in the previous two elections. Lawrence hardly faced a chance in the general election, and Dicks was swept into his fourteenth term in a landslide.

District 7

This district, the most liberal in Washington, encompasses most of the city of Seattle and has been represented by Democratic Congressman Jim McDermott since he was first elected in 1988. Running for a seventh term this year, McDermott faced off against Republican Carol Cassady and Libertarian Stan Lippman, whom he crushed in the general election by a convincing margin.

District 8

Incumbent Republican Congresswoman Jennifer Dunn ran for a seventh term in this liberal-leaning district and faced Democratic nominee Heidi Behrens-Benedict and Libertarian Mark Taff in the general election. Though this district, based in the eastern suburbs of Seattle, has a tendency to vote Democratic, the potential potency of Behrens-Benedict’s candidacy was hampered by the fact that she has achieved perennial status, running for the same seat two previous times. Ultimately, Congresswoman Dunn was re-elected by a solid margin on election day.

District 9

In his bid for a fourth term, incumbent Democratic Congressman Adam Smith was opposed by Republican State Representative Sarah Casada and Libertarian candidate J. Mills in the general election. Congressman Smith represents a liberal-leaning district that runs from the state’s capital of Olympia to some of the southern suburbs of Seattle, and, true to the liberal tendencies of his constituency, Smith was re-elected by a substantial margin over Casada and Mills.

References

Washington
2002
United States House of Representatives